The 2020–21 UT Arlington Mavericks women's basketball team represented the University of Texas at Arlington during the 2020–21 NCAA Division I women's basketball season. The basketball team, led by first-year head coach Shereka Wright, played all home games at the College Park Center along with the UT Arlington Mavericks men's basketball team. They were members of the Sun Belt Conference.

Previous season 
The Mavericks, led by Krista Gerlich, finished the 2019–20 season 21–11, 14–4 in Sun Belt play to finish third in the conference. They made it to the 2019-20 Sun Belt Conference women's basketball tournament where they defeated Texas State in the First Round before losing to South Alabama in the Quarterfinals. Following the season, all conference tournaments as well as all postseason play was cancelled due to the COVID-19 pandemic. This would also be Gerlich's last season at the helm of the program as she would take on the position of head coach at Texas Tech following the season. Gerlich left the program as the winningest-coach in women's basketball program history.

Offseason

Departures

Transfers

Recruiting

Roster

Schedule and results

|-
!colspan=9 style=| Non-conference Regular Season
|-

|-
!colspan=9 style=| Conference Regular Season
|-

|-
!colspan=9 style=| Sun Belt Tournament

See also
 2020–21 UT Arlington Mavericks men's basketball team

References

UT Arlington Mavericks women's basketball seasons
UT Arlington Mavericks
UT Arlington Mavericks women's basketball
UT Arlington Mavericks women's basketball